Klauß is a German language surname and a variant of Klaus. It stems from a reduced form of the male given name Nicholas. Notable people with the name include:
Dieter Klauß (1947–2010), German field hockey player
Gauthier Klauss (1987), former French slalom canoeist
Kristoffer Klauß (1988), German rapper
Max Klauß (1947), retired East German long jumper
Michael Klauß (footballer, born 1970) (1970), German former professional footballer
Michael Klauß (footballer, born 1987) (1987), German footballer
Natasha Klauss (1975), Colombian actress
Klauss (footballer) (born 1997), João Klauss de Mello, Brazilian footballer

German-language surnames
Surnames from given names